The abyssal cutthroat eel (Meadia abyssalis) is an eel in the family Synaphobranchidae (cutthroat eels). It was described by Toshiji Kamohara in 1938. It is a marine, deep water-dwelling eel which is known from the Indo-Pacific, including Brazil, the Hancock Seamount, the Hawaiian and Society islands, Japan, Mauritius, and Réunion. It is found off the continental slope, and dwells at a depth range of 100–329 metres. Males can reach a maximum total length of 73 centimetres.

References

Synaphobranchidae
Taxa named by Toshiji Kamohara
Fish described in 1938